The 3rd Marine Division is an infantry division of the United States Marine Corps based at Camp Courtney, Marine Corps Base Camp Smedley D. Butler and Okinawa, Japan.  It is one of three active duty divisions in the Marine Corps and together with the 1st Marine Aircraft Wing (1stMAW) and the 3rd Marine Logistics Group (3rd MLG) forms the III Marine Expeditionary Force (III MEF).  The division was first formed during World War II and saw four years of continuous combat in the Vietnam War.

During its history, four commanding generals became the Commandant of the Marine Corps (David M. Shoup, Robert E. Cushman Jr., Louis H. Wilson Jr. and Robert Neller) and another four commanding generals became Assistant Commandant of the Marine Corps (Charles D. Barrett, Allen H. Turnage, Lewis W. Walt and Raymond G. Davis).

Three commanding generals were recipients of Medal of Honor, the United States of America's highest and most prestigious personal military decoration that may be awarded to recognize U.S. military service members who distinguished themselves by acts of valor. They were: David M. Shoup, Louis H. Wilson Jr. and Raymond G. Davis.

Commanding generals

World War II

Reactivation

See also
 List of United States Marine Corps divisions
 List of 1st Marine Aircraft Wing Commanders
 List of 1st Marine Division Commanders
 List of 2nd Marine Division Commanders
 List of Historically Important U.S. Marines
 List of United States Marine Corps aircraft wings
 List of active United States Marine Corps aircraft squadrons

References

Divisions of the United States Marine Corps
United States Marine Corps generals